Sonia Bergamasco (born 16 January 1966) is an Italian actress.

Born in Milan, Bergamasco graduated in piano at the Giuseppe Verdi Conservatory and then enrolled the drama school of the Piccolo Teatro, graduating in 1990. The same year, she made her stage debut in Giorgio Strehler's Arlecchino dei giovani.

She made her film debut in 1994, in the film Miracoli, storie per corti, in the segment Antonio Mastronunzio pittore sannita directed by Mario Martone. In 2001 she had her breakout role as Sofia, the main character in Giuseppe Bertolucci's Probably Love. In 2004 thanks to her performance in The Best of Youth she won the Nastro d'Argento for Best Actress along with the rest of the female cast.

Bergamasco is married to actor Fabrizio Gifuni.

Selected filmography 
Probably Love (2001)
The Best of Youth (2003)
 Einstein (2008)
 Wild Blood (2008)
 Tutti pazzi per amore (TV, 2008-2010)
 Giulia Doesn't Date at Night (2009)
 The Woman of My Dreams (2010)
Make a Fake (2011)
 Me and You (2012)
 Quo Vado? (2016)
 Bloody Richard (2017)
 Like a Cat on a Highway (2017)
Like a Cat on a Highway 2 (2021)

References

External links 
 
 

1966 births
Actresses from Milan
Italian stage actresses
Italian film actresses
Italian television actresses
Living people
21st-century Italian actresses
Nastro d'Argento winners
Milan Conservatory alumni
20th-century Italian actresses